Elie Hall is a town in Saint Patrick Parish, Grenada.  It is located near the northern end of the island.

See also
List of cities in Grenada

References 

Populated places in Grenada